Guido Marzulli is a figurative Italian painter .

Biography

Guido Marzulli was born in Bari, July 8, 1943.

His father – Michele Marzulli, who was also a poet and writer – and his mother Rosa Tosches were skilled painters.

He began his artistic activity in Bari, where he spent his adolescence and attended various meetings and debates with most important scholars and Italian painters, used to be part of the literary and artistic salon established in his parent home during the 1960s.

Also in Bari he finished his university studies and completed a degree in Economics.

In 1970, he moved to Rome, where he deepened his research on both landscape and portrait. During the same period, he traveled along Europe, broadening his knowledge to the greatest artists of antiquity and European masters from the nineteenth and beginning of the 20th century.

Since 1991, he has lived in Milan and continued painting also in his summer house in Santa Severa (Rome).

Marzulli originally set his work along the path traced by the naturalist Neapolitan tradition, he revisits it through the impressionist experience, interpreting it with strength and a 20th-century mark.

In the second half of the 1970s he took a strong position against informal and conceptual art (as the Transavantgarde movement did in the late 1970s and 1980').

He rejected abstract art and focused on figurative painting, receiving awards and acknowledgements  including the Gold Medal at the Biennale of Rome G.Tortelli in 1990.

Marzulli knew well the concept of Modern Art, but he chose to keep his work in a more traditional form, representing daily life and the human figure as its main character.

His works have a realistic  basis, but also a subjective component  which reflects the inner feelings of the painter.

He is considered a contemporary representative of figurative realism.

Stylistically, Guido Marzulli can be associated with Contemporary Realism. 
 
The painstaking quality of the refinement in his paintings mean production is not high, so paintings are found only rarely on the market as a result.

Marzulli starts from the belief that the pictorial story doesn’t need intermediaries to explain the meanings, but must be easy to interpret by common people who should be able to recognize themselves into it, feel direct emotions and find out resemblances of own private memories without any difficulties.

He, on the other hand, doesn’t scatter himself behind symbolism or hidden meanings, and keeps a fine balance between contemporary and an everyday sense of elapsed time, getting inspired by memories and by social reality, interpreting those, sometimes with an indirect nostalgic mind, with a straight and equable language, chromatic evocative personal sense  and often adapting the mere visual aspect to his own feeling and, to his own ideal of composite armory.

He composed, with a well balanced idealism and realism at the same time, views and characteristic urban glimpses with easy reading expression and with an intimate and realistic background, together with life scenes, open markets, seascapes, intimate domestic interiors with figures  and intense portraits, some of these representing his wife, the source of inspiration of many of his works.

Museums

His works are conserved at the Museums of Bari (Pinacoteca metropolitana di Bari) and Latina (Galleria Civica d'Arte Moderna e Contemporanea di Latina), Foggia (Museo Civico e Pinacoteca Comunale di Foggia = Civic Museum and Municipal Gallery of Foggia) and Matera (Museo Nazionale di Matera).

The photographic list of many of his paintings and the biographical documentation are in leaflets dedicated to this artist in the Bio-iconographic Archive of the Supervisory Office of the Galleria Nazionale d'Arte Moderna (National Gallery of Modern and Contemporary Art) in Rome (Ministry of cultural assets).

References

Bibliography

Rif.1" DIZIONARIO ENCICLOPEDICO INTERNAZIONALE D'ARTE MODERNA E CONTEMPORANEA".ed.Ferrara,Alba,2003"p"503.
Rif.2" ANNUARIO D'ARTE MODERNA ARTISTI CONTEMPORANEI",ED.Napoli,ACCA"in...Arte"Editrice s.r.l.,2003"p"513,.
Rif.3" Annuario COMED guida internazionale delle belle arti".ed.Milano,Comed,2004."p"196..
Rif.4 Catalogo dell'Arte Moderna - Gli Artisti Italiani dal Primo  Novecento ad Oggi - . Ed. Milano, Giorgio MONDADORI, 2009. N.45, sez.II "p" 280, sez.III "p" 100. .
Rif.5 PROTAGONISTI DELL’ARTE 2014 DAL XIX SECOLO AD OGGI . - Parte I "p." 127 - Parte II "p" 69. ed.EA Editore. .
Rif.6 The BEST 2015 Modern and Contemporary ARTISTS - "p." 113 - Ed. curated by S.& F.S. Russo - Roma.
Rif.7 FRA TRADIZIONE E INNOVAZIONE - Artisti Europei da non dimenticare - Vol. III - Ed. Napoli Nostra 2015, "p" 117, 127, 130 - ill. "p" 117 - 127.
Rif.8  PREMIO INTERNAZIONALE PAOLO LEVI. - "p." 28 e "p." 323 - Ed. Effetto Arte, 2017. .

External links

Official Site of the Pinacoteca Metropolitana di Bari - (Arte Contemporanea = Ricerca). 
http://www.askart.com/AskART/index.aspx?aspxerrorpath=/askart/alpha/M13.aspx = (Ricerca).
Official Site of the Galleria Nazionale d’Arte Moderna e Contemporanea di ROMA  = “GNAM - Opac Galleria Nazionale di Arte Moderna - (Selezionare: Archivio Bioiconografico) = (selezionare: Biografico / Iconografico = Ricerca).

1943 births
People from Bari
Modern painters
20th-century Italian painters
Italian male painters
21st-century Italian painters
Living people
Artist families
Painters
20th-century Italian male artists
21st-century Italian male artists